SuperKaramba is a tool, a so-called widget engine, that allows the creation of functionality enhancement modules (desktop widgets) on the KDE desktop. The desktop widgets are usually embedded directly into the background and do not disturb the normal view of the desktop. The use of SuperKaramba is not limited to KDE, but certain libraries from KDE are required. SuperKaramba had been included in KDE since version 3.5. SuperKaramba is similar to gDesklets for GNOME. The name derives from Portuguese and Spanish super caramba, meaning approximately "super wow" or "super cool" (caramba itself being a euphemism for carallo).

Together, Kicker, KDesktop and SuperKaramba build the graphical shell of the K Desktop Environment 3. In KDE Software Compilation 4, Kicker, KDesktop, and SuperKaramba were replaced by KDE Plasma 4. The graphical shells KDE Plasma 4 and KDE Plasma 5 being widget engines of their own, SuperKaramba is no longer necessary and e.g. "Kicker" was re-implemented as such a desktop widget.

How it works 

Authors use text files to create themes that define their widget. They then have the option of adding a Python, Ruby or JavaScript script to make the widget interactive.

Possible uses 

 Interactive weather forecasts
 Control and announcement of MP3 playing with XMMS or Amarok
 Calendar and notes
 Original clocks
 System monitor for CPU, network, non-removable disks
 Notification of new messages in mailboxes
 News tickers and RSS aggregators
 Animated menu bars
 Custom toolbars
 Search tools

History 
Karamba was originally written by Hans Karlsson as a school project in March 2003.  It gained a lot of popularity when it was uploaded to KDE-Look and people began writing themes for it. Karamba only functioned on text files that were written with pseudo-XML format.  It became so popular so quickly that Hans had to hand over the project to others who had time to expand upon what he had begun.

By the end of April 2003, Adam Geitgey took over maintenance of the project.  He added python scripting support to karamba, which is where it took on a new name, SuperKaramba. Adam kept the project alive, added new features and applied patches from other developers until around April 2005.  At that point, a group of developers who wanted to move SuperKaramba even further pushed to get it included in a KDE major release.

SuperKaramba was integrated into KDE 3.5 as part of the kdeutils package, and some of the ideas that it presents have become part of KDE 4’s desktop and panel interface called Plasma, which also has support for the SuperKaramba widgets.

Notes and references

External links 

Sourceforge Project Homepage
Karamba Themes at kde-look.org
SuperKaramba Tutorial

KDE software
Software that uses Qt
Unix windowing system-related software
Widget engines